Teloleptoneta is a monotypic genus of European leptonetids containing the single species, Teloleptoneta synthetica. It was first described by C. Ribera in 1988, and has only been found in Portugal.

See also
 List of Leptonetidae species

References

Spiders of Europe
Leptonetidae
Monotypic Araneomorphae genera